Night Ranger is an American hard rock band from San Francisco formed in 1979 that gained popularity during the 1980s with a series of albums and singles. Guitarist Brad Gillis and drummer Kelly Keagy have been the band's only constant members, though bassist Jack Blades performed on all but one of their albums. Other current members of the band include guitarist Keri Kelli and keyboardist Eric Levy.

The band's first five albums sold more than 10 million copies worldwide and the group has sold 17 million albums total. The quintet is best known for the power ballad "Sister Christian", which peaked at number five on the Billboard Hot 100 in June 1984, along with several other top 40 hit singles in the 1980s, including "Don't Tell Me You Love Me", "When You Close Your Eyes", "Sentimental Street", "Four in the Morning (I Can't Take Any More)", and "Goodbye."

After their success waned in the late 1980s, the band split up in 1989, and its members pursued other musical endeavors, including group and solo efforts. Brad Gillis and Kelly Keagy teamed up with bassist Gary Moon, and released an album without the other original band members in 1995, but the band soon reunited to release two new albums in the latter half of the decade. Though there have since been personnel changes, the band continues to record and tour.

History

Beginnings 
The group's origin can be traced to Rubicon, a pop/funk group led by Jerry Martini, who gained fame as a member of Sly and the Family Stone. After Rubicon's demise in 1979, bassist Jack Blades formed a trio with two other Rubicon members, drummer Kelly Keagy and guitarist Brad Gillis. Performing under the name Stereo, the threesome added keyboardist Alan Fitzgerald, a former member of Montrose, in 1980. Fitzgerald soon recommended enlisting a second virtuoso guitarist, so Jeff Watson, who led his own band in Northern California, was added to the group. As Stereo, the band played small clubs in San Francisco in 1980, such as the Palms in the Tenderloin. By late that year, the band name was changed to "Ranger" and were opening for acts such as Sammy Hagar.

1980s 
In 1982 the band changed its name to Night Ranger after a country band, the Rangers, claimed a trademark infringement. By this point, they had recorded Dawn Patrol for Boardwalk Records and done opening stints for ZZ Top and Ozzy Osbourne; the latter had employed Brad Gillis as a replacement guitarist for the recently deceased Randy Rhoads, in the spring and summer of 1982. After Boardwalk folded, producer Bruce Bird secured Night Ranger a deal with MCA on their Camel subsidiary in 1983.

Rolling Stone's review of 7 Wishes took a swipe at Night Ranger's "formula" of "sub-Broadway" ballads. Other critics were even less flattering, with terms such as "poseurs" and "pomp-rockers" put forth in various music guides, but favorable critics, such as Hit Parader, underscored Jack Blades' puppy-dog appeal, which won over female fans, while Gillis and Watson's dueling guitars pleased the same male audience that guitar-driven bands such as Van Halen had already begun to cultivate. Both guitarists also featured prominently in magazines such as Guitar for the Practicing Musician.

Dawn Patrols first single, "Don't Tell Me You Love Me", received a boost through its MTV video airplay, and peaked modestly at number 40 on the Billboard Hot 100 chart. "Sing Me Away", a concert favorite sung by Keagy, fell short of the top 40 at a peak position of number 54, though it also was featured on MTV. Night Ranger's popularity solidified with their second album, Midnight Madness, which pushed the band from opening act to headliner status by the summer of 1984. Apart from "Rock in America", Midnight Madness spun off two hit ballads: "When You Close Your Eyes" (number 14) and "Sister Christian" (number five), written and sung by Kelly Keagy for his younger sister, Christine. "Sister Christian" proved to be the band's milestone—as well as a millstone. According to a later interview with Gillis, "Sister Christian" was actually completed in 1982, but Gillis said the band chose not to release it on Dawn Patrol because they were afraid of losing their hard rock credibility.

In 1985 Night Ranger continued headlining their own tours in support of 7 Wishes, which followed a very loose concept of the band flying across the ocean in a WWII B-25 Mitchell bomber. Blades later reported Gillis and he were fascinated by World War II planes. Night Ranger's "Sentimental Street" video even placed them in an Amelia Earhart scenario, with the entire band lost at sea. Like Midnight Madness, 7 Wishes garnered three hit singles: "Sentimental Street" (number eight; sung by Kelly Keagy); Blades' mid-tempo rocker "Four in the Morning (I Can't Take Anymore)" (number 19), the title describing the time of night Blades wrote the song; and the pleasant, acoustic-flavored "Goodbye" (number 17), which had the band veering in an overtly folk-rock, even country, direction. According to a 2001 TNN interview, Blades wrote "Goodbye" in memory of his older brother, James, who had died from a heroin overdose several years before.

Between 1984 and 1987, Night Ranger branched out into soundtracks, recording or contributing songs to several teen-oriented films. In 1984, the band released "Interstate Love Affair" (later appearing on 7 Wishes) for Teachers, starring Nick Nolte. In 1985, they also contributed another 7 Wishes track, "This Boy Needs to Rock", to the soundtrack of Explorers. The band also received exposure on two Anthony Michael Hall vehicles, Sixteen Candles (1984) and Out of Bounds (1986). "Rumours in the Air" from Midnight Madness appeared on the former, while the latter featured "Wild and Innocent Youth", a rollicking Blades-Keagy composition that has still never been released on a Night Ranger album or compilation.

In 1987 Blades co-wrote the title theme to the Michael J. Fox film The Secret of My Success, which served as the lead-off single on the band's next album, Big Life. Unlike the previous three Night Ranger albums produced by Pat Glasser, this one was produced by David Foster, and featured more up-tempo songs than power ballads.

Big Life featured some fairly mature Blades-Keagy songwriting, including the nuanced fan favorite "Rain Comes Crashing Down", inspired by a stormy California afternoon. Sung by Keagy, "Carry On" was most reminiscent of classic Night Ranger, and featured as the flip side of "Secret of My Success". None of the chosen Big Life singles hit the top 40. "Secret of My Success" stalled just short of hit-single status at number 64 on Billboard's Hot 100 despite heavy MTV rotation in the spring of 1987. Night Ranger also openly quarreled with MCA over choosing "Hearts Away" in lieu of one of their heavier songs. Their label expected another top-10 ballad, like "Sister Christian" or "Sentimental Street", but despite Keagy's passionate vocals, "Hearts Away" failed to catch on during Night Ranger's 1987 tour (peaking at number 90 on Billboard's Hot 100)—a vigorous series of dates across North America and the Caribbean, featuring The Outfield as the opening act. A third single/video was released for "Color Of Your Smile", but it failed to reach the charts due to limited airplay.

In early 1988, Fitzgerald left during the recording of Night Ranger's fifth album, citing his own diminished role in the guitar-driven band, though Fitzgerald had originally suggested the addition of Jeff Watson to augment the band's sound in the first place. With "Fitz" gone, Night Ranger acquired a touring keyboardist, Jesse Bradman, to complete the next album, Man in Motion, which promised a return to earlier form with more hard rock to anchor the group's sagging fortunes. None of the singles from it were distinguished enough to gain radio airplay, though, as MCA once again chose ballads over rockers. "I Did It for Love" (written by Russ Ballard) fared poorly, even with a cameo appearance by popular actress Morgan Fairchild in the video. The band still views "Restless Kind" as a favorite, but it failed to chart. "Don't Start Thinking (I'm Alone Tonight)" and "Reason to Be" were similarly unsuccessful in early 1989. Man in Motion thus became the first Night Ranger album not to achieve gold or platinum status.

 Early 1990s: "Moon Ranger" era 
After a tour in 1988–89 supporting Man in Motion (including an opening slot for Kansas), Blades left Night Ranger to form the popular super-group Damn Yankees with Tommy Shaw of Styx.

In 1991, Keagy and Gillis enlisted Gary Moon (ex-Three Dog Night) to replace Blades as vocalist/bassist and decided to reform as a trio after Jeff Watson decided to pursue a solo career. In 1993, David Zajicek was added as a full member on guitar, keyboards, and backing vocals to the new unit of the group and to back the coming album and bolster the group's stage sound.

The reformed nucleus of the group (Gillis, Keagy, Moon, and Zajicek) then recorded Feeding off the Mojo in 1995, with producer David Prater, who previously introduced Zajicek to Night Ranger.

 1996–1999: "Reunion" 

In 1996 Blades returned to Night Ranger, which ultimately led to a reunion of all five original members for two studio albums on CMC Records, which engineered a similar comeback for Styx. While Neverland and Seven did not become as successful as the band's early material in the United States, these albums became quite popular in Japan, and the ballad "Forever All Over Again" (from Neverland) did become a minor Adult Contemporary hit in the States. The band continued to tour between solo albums and projects, mostly on the summer festival circuit. Blades also began a stint as chief counselor for the Rock 'n Roll Fantasy Camp.

In 1999, they joined other 1980s bands in the second installment of the Rock Never Stops Tour, which also happened to feature Blades' former Damn Yankees bandmate Ted Nugent.

 2000–2010 
In 2003, Fitzgerald was replaced by Great White rhythm guitarist/keyboardist Michael Lardie. Fitzgerald began handling offstage keyboards once again for Van Halen in 2004.

In 2007, while working on their next release, Hole in the Sun, Watson was fired from the band. His replacement for the remainder of their 2007 tour was Winger/Whitesnake guitarist Reb Beach. Lardie and Beach soon left the band to focus on Great White and Winger/Whitesnake, respectively. Christian Matthew Cullen replaced Lardie in 2007, while Joel Hoekstra took over for Beach by early 2008.

Hole in the Sun was released overseas in April 2007, but did not appear in the US until July 2008.

In January 2008, in a podcast interview with Stuck in the 80s, Blades said the band's latest album, Hole in the Sun, would be released in 2008 and supported by a national tour. In addition, he said the band was flying to Guantanamo Bay, Cuba, in late January to play a special show for Navy and Marines troops on the island. To date, Night Ranger has sold 16 million albums worldwide.

 2011–present 
When not with Night Ranger, Hoekstra played guitar for the hit Broadway show Rock of Ages and the Trans-Siberian Orchestra. Hoekstra also did double duty for a stretch of the band's 2011 tour, filling in for Mick Jones of Foreigner, which was also on the bill that summer along with Journey.

On March 8, 2011, Night Ranger announced new member Eric Levy (Garaj Mahal) and the departure of Christian Matthew Cullen.

Night Ranger released its new album, Somewhere In California, on June 21, 2011. The video for the first single, "Growin' Up in California", can be seen on YouTube.

On March 25, 2012, Night Ranger gave an a cappella performance of the Star-Spangled Banner prior to the NASCAR Sprint Cup race at Auto Club Speedway in Fontana, California.

In May 2012, Night Ranger celebrated the 30th anniversary of their debut album Dawn Patrol by recording "24 Strings and a Drummer" as both a live DVD and album in an intimate, all-acoustic setting in front of a select number of fans at TRI Studios in San Rafael, California. According to Brave Words, the CD/DVD features some of their greatest hits, such as "(You Can Still) Rock in America" and "Sister Christian", in new acoustic arrangements. The live acoustic album consist of 12 songs plus a bonus track.

On June 4, 2012, Night Ranger returned to the Islington Academy in London for the second headlining show in 12 months at the 800-capacity venue.

On July 12, 2012, Night Ranger opened for the German band The Scorpions at its US farewell "Get Your Sting and Blackout" tour at Merriweather Post Pavilion in Columbia, Maryland. Alongside their major hits, the band also commemorated Gillis's brief stint with Ozzy Osbourne's band with a cover of "Crazy Train".

From July 13 to 15, 2012, Night Ranger performed in the small midwestern town of Woodhaven, Michigan, for the Uncle Sam Jam.

On September 1, 2012, Night Ranger performed as the headlining act for the "River Days" festival in Portsmouth, Ohio. Keyboardist Eric Levy was forced to miss this performance due to his wife giving birth. Brandon Ethridge (from the musicals Rock of Ages and We Will Rock You) handled the keyboards for this performance.

In late 2012, guitarist Keri Kelli (whose resume includes stints with Alice Cooper, Slash, Skid Row, Vince Neil Band, Ratt, Warrant, L.A. Guns, Tal Bachman, John Waite, and others) came aboard Night Ranger to substitute for Joel Hoekstra while he was off playing for Trans-Siberian Orchestra. He likewise returned in late 2013, once again to fill in for Hoekstra, when Trans-Siberian called him away again.

On June 10, 2014, Night Ranger released their 11th studio album, High Road, available in CD, vinyl, and digital formats. A deluxe edition includes a bonus track, and a DVD of music videos and behind-the-scenes extras; Best Buy offers an exclusive version of the deluxe edition with a second bonus track.

On August 21, 2014, Hoekstra was announced as leaving the band to join the guitarist he originally replaced, Reb Beach, in Whitesnake. Keri Kelli was then brought back in as the permanent replacement for Hoekstra.

The band released a live DVD/double CD recording on December 2, 2016, with Frontiers Records. Celebrating the band's 35th anniversary, "35 Years and a Night in Chicago" was recorded May 7, 2016, at the House of Blues in Chicago, Illinois. Included in the release is a new song, "Day and Night". A second encore that night featured another new song, "Running Out of Time". These new songs were part of an album of new material.

On January 13, 2017, the band released a new single, "Somehow Someway", from Don't Let Up. The album was released by Frontiers Music SRL on March 24, 2017. It features 11 songs, and was produced by the band. It is the first studio album by the group to include Keri Kelli on guitar.

On May 24, 2021, Night Ranger announced the upcoming album ATBPO, to be released in August.

 Musical style 
Night Ranger's music is typically classified as hard rock, glam metal, and arena rock.

 Band members Current members'''
Kelly Keagy – drums, percussion, lead and backing vocals 
Brad Gillis – lead and rhythm guitars, backing vocals 
Jack Blades – bass, lead and backing vocals, rhythm and acoustic guitars 
Eric Levy – keyboards, synthesizers, piano, backing vocals 
Keri Kelli – lead and rhythm guitars, backing vocals 

 Discography 

 Studio albums 
 Dawn Patrol (1982)
 Midnight Madness (1983)
 7 Wishes (1985)
 Big Life (1987)
 Man in Motion (1988)
 Feeding off the Mojo (1995)
 Neverland (1997)
 Seven (1998)
 Hole in the Sun (2007)
 Somewhere in California (2011)
 High Road (2014)
 Don't Let Up (2017)
 ATBPO'' (2021)

See also 
 List of glam metal bands and artists
 List of hard rock musicians (N–Z)

References

External links 

 
 
 
 Interview with Brad Gillis on Yuzu Melodies

1982 establishments in California
1989 disestablishments in the United States
Articles which contain graphical timelines
CMC International artists
Frontiers Records artists
Glam metal musical groups from California
Hard rock musical groups from California
MCA Records artists
Musical groups disestablished in 1989
Musical groups established in 1982
Musical groups from San Francisco
Musical groups reestablished in 1991
Universal Music Group artists